Michael Phelan (born 1982) is an Irish Gaelic footballer who played as a right wing-back for the Tipperary senior team.

Born in Ardfinnan, County Tipperary, Phelan first arrived on the inter-county scene at the age of seventeen when he first linked up with the Tipperary minor team before later joining the under-21 side. He made his senior debut during the 2006 championship. Phelan subsequently became a regular member of the starting fifteen.

At club level Phelan is a one-time championship medallist with Ardfinnan. He also plays hurling with Ballybacon–Grange.

Phelan retired from inter-county football following the conclusion of the 2009 championship.

Honours

Player

Ardfinnan
Tipperary Senior Football Championship (1): 2005

References

1982 births
Living people
Ardfinnan Gaelic footballers
Ballybacon-Grange hurlers
Tipperary inter-county Gaelic footballers